Son of the Sun is a 2008 Turkish comedy film directed by Onur Ünlü.

Cast 
 Haluk Bilginer - Alper Canan
 Özgü Namal - Sule
  - Fikri Semsigil
 Bülent Emin Yarar - Kurban Murat 
 Hümeyra - Saadet Semsigil
 Tansu Biçer - Burak
 Ahmet Kural - Ahmet
 Görkem Yeltan - Cahide Canan

References

External links 

2008 comedy films
2008 films
Turkish comedy films